The men's 4x100 metres relay event at the 1990 World Junior Championships in Athletics was held in Plovdiv, Bulgaria, at Deveti Septemvri Stadium on 11 and 12 August.

Medalists

Results

Final
12 August

Heats
11 August

Heat 1

Heat 2

Heat 3

Participation
According to an unofficial count, 68 athletes from 17 countries participated in the event.

References

4 x 100 metres relay
Relays at the World Athletics U20 Championships